Commission or commissioning may refer to:

Business and contracting
 Commission (remuneration), a form of payment to an agent for services rendered
 Commission (art), the purchase or the creation of a piece of art most often on behalf of another
 A contract for performance or creation of a specific work
 Commissioning, a process or service provided to validate the completeness and accuracy of a project or venture:
 Building commissioning, a quality assurance process during and following building construction
 Project commissioning, a process of assuring that all components of a facility are designed, installed, tested, operated, and maintained according to the requirements of the owner or client

Government

Civil
 A government agency, regulatory agency or statutory authority which operates under the authority of a board of commissioners, including:
 Independent agencies of the United States government
An executive branch of government, often with characteristics of other branches of government:
 Town commissioners, elected local government bodies established in urban areas in Ireland in the 19th century
 City Commission, a form of local government (common in the United States)
 The European Commission, a body incorporating features of an executive branch of government and a civil service
 Presidential Commission (United States), a type of high level research group
 Royal Commission, a form of public inquiry
Commissioning, the process of identifying an area's need for public services and then designing and securing the services to meet the need
Clinical commissioning groups, 135 NHS organisations in England responsible for commissioning healthcare
Commissioning support units, which provide regional support for Clinical commissioning groups

Military
 Commission (document), a document given to commissioned officers
 Commissioned officer, who derives authority directly from a sovereign power; contrast with warrant officer and non-commissioned officer
 Purchase of commissions in the British Army
 Ship commissioning, placing a warship in active military duty

Other uses
 Great Commission, a tenet of Christian theology given by Jesus to spread his teachings
 The Commission (American Mafia), the governing body of the mafia in the United States
 Commissioned (gospel group)
 Commission of a crime, in law

See also 
 
 Commissioner
 Decommission (disambiguation)
 The Commission (disambiguation)
 Letters patent, an open letter issued by a government granting an office or other status to someone or some entity